Chhet Sovanpanha (born 6 September 1986) is a Cambodian singer. She is the only singer to reach the top rankings in Cambodia's competitive music industry with almost no self-promotion.

Biography

Early life
Her father is a sculptor who is able to earn enough money for a fair standard of living. She is a college graduate. She loved singing since an early age and has performed in many shows for children.

The beginning
At the age of 19, she became a singer for Rasmey Hang Meas Production (2005) after she auditioned for a music show on Cambodian CTN Television. The producers of Rasmey Hang Meas were immediately drawn to her soulful and rockish voice. After a few vocal tests, she was awarded with a five-year contract with Rasmey Hang Meas Production. She is the youngest to sing for Rasmey Hang Meas Production.

Music
Chhet Sovanpanha has released many chart-topping albums one after another. Her first song Mouse Loves Rice shot straight to the top and made her a Pop Princess. Her debut album Mouse Loves Rice (2005) sold 500 copies domestically and became the biggest selling debut album by a female artist ever in Cambodia music history. In light of the success of Mouse Loves Rice (2005), Panha continued to work on more different styles of music, including popular folk dance, New Year Rhythm, and of course modern pop music. One of the biggest female albums of 2006 in Cambodian Pop culture is her album, Romance of the Wind (2006) – a collaboration with pop sensations Kim Leakhena and Pich Sophea. The album spawned four No.1 songs and has sold almost 620 copies to date. Due to massive success with Romance of the Wind (2006), she released a follow up album entitled, Love Tree (2006), with Kim Leakhena and Pich Sophea again. The three were then dubbed the 3 Angels of RHM. Sovan Panha has worked with many top producers and songwriters, and has also written her own music as well. Her major follow up album was Guitarist in Tears (2007), which has sold almost 720 copies domestically. After taking a break from music due to personal and family reasons for almost two years, Chhet Sovan Panha returned to the music scene in late 2009 with a brand new album entitled, The Loneliness Heart (2009). The album is her most critically acclaimed album to date and marks a new era of music domination by Sovan Panha. The first single off the album, The Path To End Love, was released in August 2009 and the song spent an amazing 41 weeks on the Khmer Music Chart, including 23 weeks at the No.1 spot. At RHM's annual Top Music Show 2010, she performed a selection of brand new songs from her upcoming untitled album and in January 2011, she released her brand new studio album entitled, Gomen Nasai (2011). The album's lead single, Love Game (2011) has already gained massive airplay and is heating up the Khmer music charts all over the nation. She is the only artist to have a video clip for every song she records. She is a favorite amongst teenagers, as well as the older generations.

Best of the Best: Live Concert
Best of the Best: Live Concert is a concert performed at the Cambodian National Stadium by all the present Cambodian singers from RHM. This occurs annually and is known to have started since 2004. Chhet Sovan Panha is one of the main performers in this concert.

Current
Chhet Sovanpanha toured Malaysia in 2008 and 2009. She toured Australia in March and April 2010, where she performed at several concert events and also shot a music video there. Currently, she is touring France and Switzerland with label mates, Nop Bayyareth and Pich Sophea.

Discography

Main albums
2005: Mouse Loves Rice
2006: Romance of the Wind
2006: Love Tree
2007: Guitarist in Tears
2009: The Loneliness Heart
2011: Gomen Nasai

Featured albums
2006: Dance Revolution
2006: Kong Xi Fa Cai
2006: Family
2006: Water Festival 2006
2006: Merry Christmas
2007: Comedy Dance
2007: Cartoon Moodiness
2007: Kiss Me
2007: Millions of Hope
2007: Problematic
2007: Who Am I?
2007: Pretty Women
2007: Water Festival 2007
2008: Kontreum Dance
2008: Frozen
2008: 2008 New Year
2008: Beautiful Girl
2008: Sweet Memories
2008: Duet
2008: Scan Virus
2008: Water Festival 2008
2008: Exciting World III
2009: New Year 2009
2009: No. 1
2009: The Loneliness Heart
2009: Want Cha
2009: You're My Dream
2010: Most Wanted I
2010: Most Wanted II
2010: Water Festival 2010 Volume 1
2010: Water Festival 2010 Volume 2
2010: The Five
2011: Delusional Tears

Main DVDs
2006: Best of the Best 2006
2006: Xtreme Zone
2007: Best of the Best 2007
2008: Top Music Show 2008
2009: Best of the Best 2009
2010: Top Music Show 2009
2011: Top Music Show 2010

External links
 Myspace
Facebook's Chhet Sovanpanha 
Instagram's Chhet Sovanpanha 

21st-century Cambodian women singers
1986 births
Living people
People from Phnom Penh